Raúl Pinzón, known as "El Tendero" (born January 1, 1980 in Barranquilla) is a Colombian Welterweight boxer.

Pro career
In Miami Raul fought Mexican sensation Canelo Álvarez on Telemundo, losing by spectacular fashion in the first round with a quick K.O. On May 15, 2009 Pizon lost to fellow Colombian Ricardo Torres. He then lost to undefeated welterweight prospect Mike Jones. In his last Fight he Lost to the future IBF and WBC welterweight champion Shawn Porter by first round KO

References

External links

1980 births
Welterweight boxers
Living people
Colombian male boxers
Sportspeople from Barranquilla
21st-century Colombian people